Enteucha basidactyla is a moth of the family Nepticulidae. It is found along the south-western coast of Florida in the United States, as well as Dominica, Belize and Ecuador. It is likely that this species has a much wider distribution in the tropical forests of the Neotropics.

The wingspan is 4.3-4.9 mm for males and 5.3-5.4 mm for females. Adults are on wing in January, from April to May and in July.

The larvae feed on Coccoloba uvifera (seagrape) in the Caribbean.

External links
A review and checklist of the Neotropical Nepticulidae (Lepidoptera)
New Leaf-Mining Moths of the Family Nepticulidae from Florida

Nepticulidae
Moths of North America
Moths of South America